Puzeh Sefid (also Romanized as Pūzeh Sefīd; also known as Bard Espīd, Mālek-e Ashtar, and Pūzeh Bardā Sepīd) is a village in Kakan Rural District, in the Central District of Boyer-Ahmad County, Kohgiluyeh and Boyer-Ahmad Province, Iran. At the 2006 census, its population was 47, in 12 families.

References 

Populated places in Boyer-Ahmad County